Allan B. Jacobs (born 29 December 1928) is an urban designer, renowned for his publications and research on urban design.  His well-known paper "Toward an Urban Design Manifesto", written with  Donald Appleyard, describes how cities should be laid out.

Prior to teaching at Berkeley, Professor Jacobs taught at the University of Pennsylvania, and worked on planning projects in the City of Pittsburgh and for the Ford Foundation in Calcutta, India, and spent eight years as Director of the San Francisco Department of City Planning. In 1978 Jacobs presented his ‘Making City Planning Work’ that offered reflections on his experiences as the San Francisco planning director from 1967 to 1975 and guided on bureaucratic and political processes navigation that often hamper the realization of desired planning policies and outcomes. Honors include a Guggenheim Fellowship, the Berkeley Citation, and the Kevin Lynch Award from the Massachusetts Institute of Technology.

Jacobs taught in the Department of City and Regional Planning at the University of California, Berkeley from 1975 until 2001, teaching courses in city planning and urban design and serving twice as the department's chair.  He is currently a Professor emeritus.  He is currently a consultant in city planning and urban design with projects in California, Oregon, and Brazil, among others.

Education 
Jacobs earned a Bachelor of Architecture, cum laude, from Miami University and a master's degree in city planning from the University of Pennsylvania in 1954.  He then attended the Harvard Graduate School of Design.

From 1954 to 1955, Jacobs was studying city planning as a Fulbright Scholar at University College London.

Notable works
 The Urban Design Element of the San Francisco General Plan
 Allan Jacobs and Donald Appleyard, Toward an Urban Design Manifesto.  Working Paper published 1982; republished with a prologue in the Journal of the American Planning Association, 1987.
 Making City Planning Work (1980)
 Looking at Cities (1985)
 Great Streets (1995)
 The Boulevard Book (2003) with Elizabeth MacDonald and Yodan Rofe
 The Good City: Reflections and Imaginations (2011)

Honors
 Athena Medal from the Congress for the New Urbanism, 2008.
 Kevin Lynch Award, presented at MIT's "Imaging the City" symposium, 1999.
 AIA Excellence in Education Award, California Chapter, 1994
 Resident in Architecture, American Academy in Rome, 1996
 Guggenheim Fellowship awarded in 1981
 Fulbright Scholar

References

Allan B. Jacobs, Project for Public Spaces. 
Allan B. Jacobs bio, Bruner Foundation. 
Allan Jacobs bio, City of Calgary (Alberta, Canada).
Allan Jacobs, University of California, Berkeley.

External links
College of Environmental Design, University of California, Berkeley.
Barry, Sean. "Speakers Envision Downtown's Future", The Daily Californian, January 19, 2006.
Pollack, Theo Mackey. "What Makes a Great Street?", New Urbs,The American Conservative, April 13, 2018.

Urban theorists
Miami University alumni
Harvard Graduate School of Design alumni
University of Pennsylvania School of Design alumni
University of Pennsylvania faculty
UC Berkeley College of Environmental Design faculty
Living people
Urban designers
American urban planners
1928 births